Synden (The Sin) is a 1994 novel by Swedish author Björn Ranelid. It won the August Prize in 1994.

References 

1994 Swedish novels
Swedish-language novels
August Prize-winning works